Sonia Osorio Vázquez (born 21 October 1992) is a Mexican professional boxer who has held the WBC interim female super flyweight title since 2019.

Professional career
Osorio made her professional debut on 11 May 2013, winning via third-round technical knockout (TKO) in a scheduled six-round bout against Patricia de Los Santos Garcia (4–10, 2 KOs) at the Sindicato de Taxistas in Cancún, Mexico.

After compiling a record of 9–2–1 (1 KO), she faced Isabel Millan (17–2–1, 8 KOs) for the WBF female flyweight title on 9 December 2016, at the Gimnasio Nuevo León Unido in Monterrey, Mexico. Osorio was disqualified in the tenth and final round for repeated head butts, receiving a warning in the fifth round followed by a point deduction in the eighth before the fight was waved off. After losing three of her next four fights, she fought Maria Goreti (4–7) for the vacant Mexican female flyweight title on 23 June 2018 at the Salón Villa Flamingos in Mexico City. Osorio defeated Goreti to capture her first professional title by unanimous decision (UD), with all three judges scoring the bout 97–93. She won two of her next three fights before facing Estrella Valverde (18–5–2, 3 KOs) for the vacant WBC interim female super flyweight title on 25 October 2019 at the Salon Riverside in Texcoco de Mora, Mexico. Osorio won the fight via UD, with two judges scoring the bout 99–91 and the third scoring it 98–92.

Professional boxing record

References

Living people
1992 births
Mexican women boxers
Boxers from Mexico City
Flyweight boxers
Super-flyweight boxers
World Boxing Council champions